Ivan Thamma (born January 30, 1999) is an American tennis player.

Thamma made his ATP main draw debut at the 2022 Dallas Open after receiving a wildcard into the doubles main draw with Adam Neff.

Thamma played college tennis at UC Davis before grad-transferring to SMU.

References

External links

1999 births
Living people
American male tennis players
Tennis players from San Diego
UC Davis Aggies men's tennis
SMU Mustangs men's tennis players